The 2014–15 season saw Glasgow Warriors compete in the Pro12 and the European Champions Cup.

Team

Coaches
 Head coach:  Gregor Townsend
 Assistant coach:  Shade Munro
 Assistant coach:  Matt Taylor
 Assistant coach:  Kenny Murray

Squad

Scottish Rugby Academy Stage 3 players

  James Malcolm – Hooker
  Fergus Scott – Hooker
  Zander Fagerson – Prop
  Cameron Fenton – Prop
  D'Arcy Rae – Prop
  Scott Cummings – Lock
  Andrew Davidson – Lock
  Andy Redmayne – Lock
  Matt Smith – Flanker
  Tommy Spinks – Flanker

  Ali Price – Scrum-half
  Gavin Lowe – Fly-half
  Neil Herron – Centre
  Jack Steele – Centre
  Glenn Bryce – Fullback

Player statistics
During the 2014–15 season, Glasgow have used 52 different players in competitive games. The table below shows the number of appearances and points scored by each player.

Staff movements

None

Player movements

Academy promotions

  Adam Ashe
  Rory Hughes

Player transfers

In

  Alex Allan from  Edinburgh
  Murray McConnell from  Ayr RFC
  Euan Murray from  Worcester Warriors
  James Downey from  Munster
  Rossouw de Klerk from  Cheetahs 
  Connor Braid from  BC Bears
  Fraser Lyle from  Stirling County

Out
  Moray Low to  Exeter Chiefs
  Chris Cusiter to  Sale Sharks
  Ruaridh Jackson to  Wasps
  Ed Kalman retired
  Byron McGuigan released
  Finlay Gillies released
  Scott Wight to  Scotland 7s
  Carlin Isles to  USA Sevens
  Folau Niua to  USA Sevens
  Connor Braid to  London Scottish (loan)
  James Downey to Wasps (loan)
  Tom Ryder to Northampton Saints

Competitions

Pre-season and friendlies

Match 1

Glasgow Warriors: 1 Alex Allan, 2 Fraser Brown, 3 Euan Murray, 4 Jonny Gray, 5 Leone Nakarawa, 6 James Eddie, 7 Tyrone Holmes, 8 Josh Strauss, 9 Murray McConnell, 10 Duncan Weir, 11 Rory Hughes, 12 James Downey, 13 Mark Bennett, 14 Lee Jones, 15 Peter Murchie
Replacements: Jerry Yanuyanutawa, Chris Fusaro, Rossouw de Klerk, Pat MacArthur, Rob Harley, Nikola Matawalu, Peter Horne, D. T. H. van der Merwe, Adam Ashe, Connor Braid, Fergus Scott

Harlequins: 15	Mike Brown, 14	Marland Yarde, 13 Matt Hopper, 12 Jordan Turner Hall, 11 Ugo Monye, 10 Nick Evans, 9 Danny Care, 1 Joe Marler, 2 Joe Gray, 3 Kyle Sinckler, 4 Charlie Matthews, 5 George Robson, 6 Luke Wallace, 7 Chris Robshaw, 8 Nick Easter
Replacements: Rob Buchanan, Mark Lambert, Paul Doran Jones, George Merrick, Sam Twomey, Joe Trayfoot, Jack Clifford, Karl Dickson, Ben Botica, Ross Chisholm, Oliie Lindsay Hague, Charlie Walker

Match 2

London Scottish: 15. Peter Lydon (replaced by Errie Claassens), 14. Miles Mantella (replaced by Mike Doneghan), 13. Lee Millar, 12. PJ Gidlow (replaced by Alec Coombes), 11. Matt Williams, 10. Dan Newton, 9. Jamie Stevenson (replaced by Sam Stuart), 1. James Hallam (replaced by Mark Lilley, replaced by Darryl Marfo), 2. Adam Kwasnicki (c) (replaced by David Cherry) 3. Max Maidment (replaced by Ben Prescott), 4. Tai Tuisamoa, 5. Adam Preocanin,(replaced by Sam Twomey) 6. Freddie Clarke(replaced by Chevvy Pennycook), 7. Neil Best, 8. James Phillips
Replacements: 16. Darryl Marfo, 17. Mark Lilley, 18. David Cherry, 19. Ben Prescott, 20. Stewart Maguire, 21. Sam Twomey, 22. Chevvy Pennycook, 23. Ross Doneghan, 24. Ben Calder, 25. Sam Stuart, 26. Mike Doneghan, 27. Errie Claassens, 28. Alec Coombes (trialist).

Glasgow Warriors: 15. Peter Murchie, 14. Tommy Seymour, 13. Mark Bennett, 12. Alex Dunbar, 11. Lee Jones, 10. Duncan Weir, 9. Henry Pyrgos (c), 1. Gordon Reid (replaced by Alex Allan), 2. Kevin Bryce, 3. Rossouw de Klerk, 4. Tim Swinson, 5. Leone Nakarawa, 6. Tyrone Holmes, 7. Chris Fusaro, 8. Adam Ashe
Replacements: 16. Fraser Brown, 17. Alex Allan, 18. Jerry Yanuyanutawa, 19. James Eddie 20. Josh Strauss 21. Niko Matawalu, 22. Rory Hughes 23. James Downey, B. George Hunter, B. Will Bordill, B. Connor Braid

Pro12

League table

Results

Round 1

Round 2

Round 3

Round 4

Round 5

Round 6

Round 7

Round 8

Round 9

Round 10

Round 11: 1872 Cup (1st Leg)

Round 12: 1872 Cup (2nd Leg)

Edinburgh Rugby won the 1872 Cup with an aggregate score of 26–24.

Round 13

Round 14

Round 15

Round 16

Round 17

Round 18

Round 19

Round 20

Round 21

Round 22

Play-offs

Semi-finals

Final

Europe

Results

Round 1

Round 2

Round 3

Round 4

Round 5

Round 6

Table

End of Season awards

Competitive debuts this season

A player's nationality shown is taken from the nationality at the highest honour for the national side obtained; or if never capped internationally their place of birth. Senior caps take precedence over junior caps or place of birth; junior caps take precedence over place of birth. A player's nationality at debut may be different from the nationality shown. Combination sides like the British and Irish Lions or Pacific Islanders are not national sides, or nationalities.

Players in BOLD font have been capped by their senior international XV side as nationality shown.

Players in Italic font have capped either by their international 7s side; or by the international XV 'A' side as nationality shown.

Players in normal font have not been capped at senior level.

A position in parentheses indicates that the player debuted as a substitute. A player may have made a prior debut for Glasgow Warriors in a non-competitive match, 'A' match or 7s match; these matches are not listed.

Tournaments where competitive debut made:

Crosshatching indicates a jointly hosted match.

Sponsorship
 BT Sport
 Rowan Glen
 McCrea Financial Services
 Malcolm Group
 QBE Insurance

Official Kit Supplier

Macron

References

2014-15
2014–15 in Scottish rugby union
2014–15 Pro12 by team
2014–15 European Rugby Champions Cup by team